Micromeria fruticosa (syn. Clinopodium serpyllifolium subsp. fruticosum), commonly known as white micromeria or white-leaved savory, is a dwarf evergreen shrub endemic to the eastern Mediterranean. It is a member of the genus Micromeria, in the family Lamiaceae. It is known as zuta levana (זוטה לבנה or זוטא לבנה) in today's Modern Hebrew and ashab a-shai (عشب الشاي) in Arabic.
The Bedouins, however, call it by the Arabic name, qurniyya, believed to be a cognate of the Hebrew qoranit, an aromatic herb described in the Mishnah. The plant's aromatic leaves (resembling mint) are used in making decoctions (herbal teas).

White-leaved savory grows mainly on rock surfaces in the low Mediterranean region, and is more common on chalk and calcrete rocks than on rocks of limestone. In the Levant its white blossoms can be seen between July to November.

Taxonomy & nomenclature

Phytochemistry 

A total of 215 phenolics and other chemical compound were identified in the methanol extracts of M. fruticosa leaves. Of which, over 180 phytochemicals (87 flavonoids, 41 phenolic acids, 16 terpenoids, 8 sulfate derivatives, 7 iridoids, and others) are reported in Micromeria. Some of the metabolites separated include: acacetin-7-O-rutinoside; apigenin 7-O-rutinoside; chlorogenic acid; coumaroylagmatine; lithospermic acid; rosmarinic acid; rutin; sagerinic acid; salvinorin C; santaflavone; and other sulfate derivatives.

Plant properties 
The plant, which contains a high concentration of the monoterpene essential oil known as pulegone, as well as isomenthol, is known for its medicinal properties. In folk remedies, it has been used in treating ailments such as abdominal pains, diarrhoea, eye infections, heart disorders, high blood pressure, weariness, exhaustion, colds and open wounds. Other usages include making a poultice from the boiled leaves and applying it onto burns and skin infections, or drinking an infusion from its leaves for relieving stomach aches, or gargling with the same for treating bad breath odors and gum infections.

Further reading

References

External links

fruticosa
Flora of Israel
Flora of Palestine (region)